The Poet Laureate of Wyoming is the poet laureate for the U.S. state of Wyoming. The position of Poet Laureate was created by executive order in 1981 with a variable term of service. The post became a customary two-year term starting on statehood day (July 10).

List of Poets Laureate
 Peggy Simson Curry (1981 – 1987)
 Charles L. Levendosky (1988 – 1995)
 Robert Roripaugh (1995 – 2003)
 David Romtvedt (2004 – 2011)
 Patricia Frolander (2011 – 2013)
 Echo Roy Klaproth (2013 – 2015)
 A. Rose Hill (2015 – 2016)
 Eugene M. Gagliano (2016–present)

See also

 Poet laureate
 List of U.S. states' poets laureate
 United States Poet Laureate

References

External links
 Wyoming Poet Laureate at Arts Council
 Wyoming Poet Laureate at Library of Congress

 
Wyoming culture
Lists of poets
American Poets Laureate